The Baker Historic District, located in Baker City, Oregon, is listed on the National Register of Historic Places. Contributing properties include the former Baker Hotel and St. Francis de Sales Cathedral.

See also
 National Register of Historic Places listings in Baker County, Oregon

References

External links

1978 establishments in Oregon
Baker City, Oregon
National Register of Historic Places in Baker County, Oregon
Historic districts on the National Register of Historic Places in Oregon